Live At Massey Hall is a live album by Canadian country rock group Blue Rodeo, released by Warner Music Canada on October 16, 2015. The album was recorded during the band's shows at Massey Hall in 2014, during their tour to support their 2013 album, In Our Nature.

Track listing
"Head Over Heels" — 4:18
"Rose Coloured Glasses" — 4:52
"Bad Timing" — 5:10
"Disappear" — 8:04
"New Morning Sun" — 4:27
"Tara's Blues" — 4:13
"Tell Me Again" — 3:36
"When The Truth Comes Out" — 3:45
"Diamond Mine" — 9:25
"Girl Of Mine" — 4:09
"After The Rain" — 6:44
"Paradise" — 4:19
"5 Days In May" — 9:26
"Lost Together" — 6:42

Chart performance

References

2015 live albums
Blue Rodeo albums
Albums recorded at Massey Hall
Music of Toronto